Patrona (Vice Admiral) Osman Pascha (c. 1792; – c. 1860) was an Ottoman naval officer who led Ottoman forces in the Battle of Sinop and became a prisoner of war until being released in 1855.

Biography 
Osman started his career in the Egyptian Navy. He commanded a brig in the Battle of Navarino (1827) and an Egyptian frigate after 1830. During the Egyptian–Ottoman War (1839–41) he joined the Ottoman Navy, commanded an Ottoman ship of line in the Bombardment of St. Acre (1840) and with regard to that he became Vice Admiral (Patrona).

When the Russo-Ottoman Crimean War started he was sent out with a small flotilla to bring troops and material to Batumi. Because of stormy weather he decided to stop and wait in Sinope, where he was attacked by Russian Admiral Pavel Nakhimov on November 30 of 1853. Osman's flotilla was destroyed, he himself was wounded in the foot and taken prisoner. He was released in 1855, and although the Patrona rank had been abolished in the meantime, he remained a member of the Admiralty.

Sources 

1792 births
1860 deaths
Ottoman Empire admirals
Ottoman military personnel of the Crimean War
People from Rize
Prisoners of war held by Russia